Deduction may refer to:

Philosophy 
 Deductive reasoning, the mental process of drawing inferences in which the truth of their premises ensures the truth of their conclusion
 Natural deduction, a class of proof systems based on simple and self-evident rules of inference that aim to closely mirror how reasoning actually occurs

Taxation 
 Tax deduction, variable tax dollars subtracted from gross income
 Itemized deduction, eligible expense that individual taxpayers in the United States can report on their Federal income tax returns
 Standard deduction, dollar amount that non-itemizers may subtract from their income

Other uses 
 English modals of deduction, English modal verbs to state how sure somebody is about something.
 Deduction (food stamps), used in the United States to calculate a household's monthly food stamp benefit goods

See also 
 Induction (disambiguation)